The Can-Am Junior Hockey League (CAJHL) is a junior hockey league with teams based in Canada. The league is independently operated and insured; it is not sanctioned by Hockey Canada, USA Hockey, or the Amateur Athletic Union. There are currently five teams in the league.

History 
The league was founded in January 2022 when six teams that were competing in the Western States Hockey League (WSHL) severed ties with the Amateur Athletic Union-sanctioned league to form their own. Five of the teams were based in Alberta, Canada, while one was based in Utah, United States.  The founding teams were the Barrhead Bombers, Cold Lake Aeros, Edmonton Eagles, Hinton Timberwolves, Vegreville Vipers, and Vernal Oilers.

On March 22, 2022, the league announced that AMP Hockey Academy from Calgary, Alberta, would be the first expansion team named the AMP Warriors and would play at WinSport Canada Olympic Park. On May 6, 2022, the Vernal Oilers joined the United States Premier Hockey League along with former WSHL teams the Seattle Totems, Bellingham Blazers, and Rogue Valley Royals. In August 2022, the Edmonton Eagles were removed from the teams listing on the league website.

Teams

Current teams

Former teams

Champions

References

External links 
 Can-Am Junior Hockey League

Junior ice hockey in the United States
Junior ice hockey in Canada